Anna Elisabet "Anna-Lisa" Lindzén (1888-1949) was a Swedish operetta singer and actress.

Life and career
Lindzén was born in Stockholm on 12 October 1888. She made her debut in 1911 as "Rosa" in Die keusche Susanne at Oscarsteatern and was after that engaged at Operett-Teatern 1909–1910. She joined the ranks of Swedish "theatre emperor" Albert Ranft during the years 1911-1917 and later appeared in Finland.

Anna-Lisa Lindzén was the sister of actress Hildegard Lindzén. From 1926 to 1933 she was married to Finnish officer Max Helge Sawonius in Helsinki.

Lindzén died in Stockholm on 3 June 1949.

Filmography
 1917 - Alexander den Store (Alexander the Great)
 1924 - Den förgyllda lergöken (The gilded ocarina)

Picture gallery

References
 Elvin Ottoson: Minns du det än... - ett avsnitt ur operettens historia (Stockholm 1941)
 
 Sveriges dödbok 1901–2009 (Swedish death index 1901–2009)

20th-century Swedish actresses
1888 births
1949 deaths
Actresses from Stockholm
Singers from Stockholm
20th-century Swedish women opera singers